The 2020 BWF World Tour Finals (officially known as the HSBC BWF World Tour Finals 2020 for sponsorship reasons) was the final tournament of the 2020 BWF World Tour. It was held from 27 to 31 January 2021 in Pak Kret, Nonthaburi, Thailand, Thailand and had a total prize of $1,500,000.

Tournament 
The 2020 BWF World Tour Finals was the third edition of the BWF World Tour Finals and was organized by Badminton Association of Thailand with sanction from the BWF. It was the last of three BWF tournaments taking place in Thailand in January 2021, after the Yonex and Toyota Thailand Opens. Participation in both Thailand Opens was mandatory to qualify and the performance during the tournaments were counted for this World Tour Finals, in addition to the 2019 Syed Modi International, 2020 Malaysia Masters, 2020 Indonesia Masters, 2020 Thailand Masters, 2020 Spain Masters, 2020 All England Open, and 2020 Denmark Open.

Venue
This tournament was held at the Impact Arena in Pak Kret, Nonthaburi, Thailand. It was originally due to be held for the third year in a row at the Tianhe Gymnasium in Guangzhou, China, but was relocated.

Point distribution 
Below is the point distribution for each phase of the tournament based on the BWF points system for the BWF World Tour Finals event.

Prize money 
The total prize money for this tournament was US$1,500,000. Distribution of prize money was in accordance with BWF regulations.

Representatives

Eligible players 
Below are the eligible players for World Tour Finals. Final ranking used was released on 24 January 2021, and counting the results from the 2019 Syed Modi International.

Men's singles

Women's singles

Men's doubles

Women's doubles

Mixed doubles

Representatives by nation 

§: Marcus Ellis from England and Seo Seung-jae from South Korea play in men's and mixed doubles, while Lauren Smith from England and Isabel Herttrich from Germany play in women's and mixed doubles.

Performance by nation

Men's singles

Group A

Group B

Finals

Women's singles

Group A

Group B

Finals

Men's doubles

Group A

Group B

Finals

Women's doubles

Group A

Group B

Finals

Mixed doubles

Group A

Group B

Finals

References

External links 
 HSBC BWF World Tour Finals website
 Tournament Link
 HSBC BWF World Tour website

BWF World Tour
BWF World Tour Finals
International sports competitions hosted by Thailand
2021 in Thai sport
BWF World Tour Finals
Badminton tournaments in Thailand